Victor Nikiema (born 23 September 1993) is a Burkinabé football player who plays for SC Ideal. He also holds Ivorian citizenship.

Club career
He made his professional debut in the Segunda Liga for Braga B on 19 August 2012 in a game against Naval.

On 5 August 2019, SC Coimbrões confirmed that they had signed Nikiema.

International
He represented Burkina-Faso at the 2009 FIFA U-17 World Cup and scored one goal in the group stage.

Personal
He is the younger brother of Abdoul-Aziz Nikiema.

References

External links
Victor Nikiema at ZeroZero

1993 births
Footballers from Abidjan
Living people
Burkinabé footballers
S.C. Braga B players
Piast Gliwice players
ACS Poli Timișoara players
Juventude de Pedras Salgadas players
G.D. Vitória de Sernache players
S.C. Freamunde players
S.C. Coimbrões players
Liga Portugal 2 players
Ekstraklasa players
Campeonato de Portugal (league) players
Burkinabé expatriate footballers
Burkinabé expatriate sportspeople in Portugal
Expatriate footballers in Portugal
Burkinabé expatriate sportspeople in Poland
Expatriate footballers in Poland
Burkinabé expatriate sportspeople in Romania
Expatriate footballers in Romania
Association football midfielders
Burkina Faso youth international footballers
21st-century Burkinabé people